SGIC is an insurance brand of Insurance Australia Group trading in South Australia. It was formerly the State Government Insurance Commission which was operated by the Government of South Australia, providing compulsory third party motor vehicle insurance.

SGIC first opened its doors for business on 4 January 1972 with a staff of 24 housed in the third level of Adelaide House at 55 Waymouth Street, Adelaide. When the Bill to establish SGIC was introduced into the South Australian Parliament, Premier Don Dunstan declared that SGIC's role was to help keep premiums at reasonable levels, ensure by competition that adequate service was given and make funds available for investment in semi governmental loans important to the development of the State. The first premium income for SGIC came from insuring the motor vehicle fleet of the South Australian Government $155,026.

SGIC moved to new premises on 24 April 1981 at 211 Victoria Square, Adelaide.

SGIC grew from a concept in 1971 to become the largest general insurer in South Australia by 1992 selling motor, home, life, commercial and health insurance throughout the state via 19 branches. By 1992 one in four South Australians was a client of SGIC and it employed close to 1,000.

In the latter half of the 1998, the SGIC was acquired by SGIO of Western Australia. In 2000 SGIO was acquired by the NRMA who in turn acquired CGU. SGIC and CGU moved to new building at 80 Flinders Street in 2005.

In moving from a totally state based insurer to being under the umbrella of the NRMA who then changed to the 'Insurance Australia Group meant the assessing resources from South Australia were sent interstate on many occasions to assist when natural disasters hit. Sydney Hailstorm, Cyclone Larry, Newcastle Floods, Victorian Bushfires 2009, Melbourne and Perth Storm 2010 were all events to which assessing assistance was sent from South Australia.

External links 
 Official SGIC Website

Financial services companies established in 1972
Insurance companies of Australia
1972 establishments in Australia